The Apocalypse of Lorvão is an illuminated manuscript from Lorvão, Portugal containing the Commentary on the Apocalypse of Beatus of Liébana Monastery, Spain. 

It is currently kept at the Torre do Tombo National Archive in Lisbon.

History 
This is a well-dated manuscript whose origin is identified through its colophon, which indicates that it was completed in 1189 in the scriptorium of the Lorvão monastery in the present municipality of Penacova, near Coimbra. It was signed by the scribe Egeas, who might also be the author of illustrations. It remained preserved in the abbey until the nineteenth century, including while the monastery changed denomination in 1205 and hosted a Cistercian community. 

The historian Alexandre Herculano discovered the manuscript in the library of the monastery in 1853 and transferred it to the national archives of Portugal in Lisbon to be part of the corpus of documents and texts in the history of Portugal (Portugaliae Monumenta Historica). The manuscript is still preserved there.

It is one of eleven manuscripts of Beatus in the Iberian record of the Memory of the World Register by UNESCO in 2015.

Description 
This is the only manuscript of the Beatus Commentary on the Apocalypse of Liébana, also called Beatus, produced in Portugal during the Middle Ages. This is a relatively primitive version of the text, probably copied from a ninth century original. It is written in a Carolingian minuscule style that made the transition to the Gothic. His miniatures are at number 70, including 18 full-page, 20 of the half-page and the other smaller and variable dimensions. The manuscript also retains its original binding.These illustrations were considered archaic for the time, marked by a thick stroke and colors dominated by orange and yellow. They may have been copied from an older model, perhaps close to the original manuscript written by Beatus of Liebana. There are also repeatedly scenes of everyday life at the time of Sancho I of Portugal. Finally, Beatus map belonging to the manuscript has been preserved but only half of it. It was reunited with the manuscript after being separated from it.

Bibliography 
 John W. Williams, The illustrated Beatus. A corpus of the illustrations of the commentary on the Apocalypse, tome V, « The Twelfth and Thirteenth Centuries », Harvey Miller Publisher, 2003, 416 pages  ( (notice 22)
 Jorge Manuel Gomes da Silva Rocha, L'image dans le Beatus de Lorvão : figuration, composition et visualité dans les enluminures du Commentaire à l'Apocalypse attribué au Scriptorium du Monastère de São Mamede de Lorvão – 1189, Thèse de doctorat en histoire de l'Université Libre de Bruxelles, Faculté de Philosophie et Lettres, 2007/2008 Online
  Anne De Egry, O apocalipse do Lorvão e a sua relação com as ilustrações medievais do Apocalipse. Lisboa : Gulbenkian, 1972. 145 p.
 Peter Klein, « The Whore of Babylone in the Beatus Codex of Lorvão », in C. Hediger (éd.), « Tout le temps du veneour est sanz oyseuseté ». Mélanges offerts à Yves Christe pour son 65ème anniversaire, Turnhout, Brepols (Culture et société médiévales, 8), 2005, p. 103-111
  Beato de Liébana: Códice del Monasterio de San Mamede de Lorvao [fac-similé], Valencia: Patrimonio Ediciones, 2003. Online

See also 
 Beatus of Liébana
 Illuminated manuscripts

References

External links 

 Notice sur le site des Archives nationales du Portugal 
 Présentation sur le site du ministère de la Culture espagnol 
 Notice sur le site du Registre de la Mémoire du monde de l'UNESCO

Arts in Portugal
12th-century illuminated manuscripts
Memory of the World Register
Illuminated beatus manuscripts